E. communis may refer to:
 Erysiphe communis, a synonym for Erysiphe cruciferarum, a plant pathogen that causes powdery mildew on brassica, especially on brussels sprouts
 Erysiphe communis f. betae, a synonym for Erysiphe betae, a form of powdery mildew that affects the sugar beet

See also
 Communis (disambiguation)